Raza Muhammad is a retired two-star general of the Pakistan Army who was served as the High Commissioner for Pakistan to Mauritius. He was concurrently accredited to Republic of Seychelles, Republic of Madagascar and Union of the Comoros. Raza has also been awarded Hilal-i-Imtiaz (Military) for his meritorious services to the Islamic Republic of Pakistan. He is currently serving in AWT, as a Director.

He has served at the Inter Services Intelligence as Director General before he was deputed to the Ministry of Defence Production (MoDP), Rawalpindi as Additional Secretary.

He is from the Sindh Regiment and was promoted to the rank of Major General in August 2008. After being promoted he was deputed as the General Officer Commanding (GOC) 11th Infantry Division Pakistan where he was transferred command by the then GOC General Raheel Sharif . Before his promotion to the rank of Major General, he served as Chief of Staff X Corps Headquarter, Director Military Intelligence Operations at the General Headquarters (Pakistan Army) Rawalpindi and Commander 30th Independent Infantry Brigade Group.

Early life and family
Raza Muhammad was born on 28 August 1957 in Havelian in the Khyber Pakhtunkhwa province of Pakistan. He obtained his earlier education in Havelian and studied in college at Abbottabad.

Raza is married and had a son and daughter.

Military career
Raza Muhammad was accepted into the Pakistan Military Academy (Kakul) in 1978 where he did the 61st PMA Long Course. He was given commission into the Pakistan Army in March 1980, and was inducted into the Sindh Regiment. As a young Captain, Raza participated in the Siachin conflict between Pakistan and India.

Later on as a Major he served as a Brigade Major and obtained his BSc in War Studies from Command and Staff College, Quetta and also served there in the Directing Staff. From there he was sent to Germany where he attended a German Staff Course from Führungsakademie der Bundeswehr, Hamburg (General Staff College) and also did a year long course in German Language. As a Lieutenant Colonel he attended the War Course at the National Defence University, Islamabad and obtained a M.Sc. degree in War Studies and an M.Phill in International Relations with a gold medal. He was also retained twice as an instructor at the National Defence University, Islamabad after having served at the Command and Staff College, Quetta as a Senior Instructor.

As a Brigadier, Raza also attended a United Nations Peacekeeping course for Decision Makers at Tampa, Florida, United States of America.

General Raza was later sent to the Inter-Services Intelligence where he served for three years, handling the external wing of the organisation.

Awards and decorations

References

Pakistani generals
Living people
1957 births
National Defence University, Pakistan alumni
Directors General of Inter-Services Intelligence
Academic staff of the National Defence University, Pakistan
Pakistan Military Academy alumni
Recipients of Hilal-i-Imtiaz
High Commissioners of Pakistan to Mauritius
High Commissioners of Pakistan to Seychelles
Ambassadors of Pakistan to Madagascar
Ambassadors of Pakistan to the Comoros
Bundeswehr Command and Staff College alumni
Pakistan Command and Staff College alumni